The Children of Men is a dystopian novel by English writer P. D. James, published in 1992. Set in England in 2021, it centres on the results of mass infertility. James describes a United Kingdom that is steadily depopulating and focuses on a small group of resisters who do not share the disillusionment of the masses.

The book received very positive reviews from many critics such as Caryn James of The New York Times, who called it "wonderfully rich" and "a trenchant analysis of politics and power that speaks urgently". The academic Alan Jacobs said, "Of all James’ novels, The Children of Men is probably the most pointed in its social criticism, certainly the deepest in its theological reflection."

Plot

The narrative voice for the novel alternates between the third person and the first person, the latter in the form of a diary kept by Dr. Theodore "Theo" Faron, an Oxford don.

The novel opens with the first entry in Theo's diary. It is the year 2021, but the novel's events have their origin in 1995, which is referred to as "Year Omega". In 1994, the sperm count of human males plummeted to zero, a feminist civil war broke out, and, with no significant scientific breakthroughs, mankind now faces imminent extinction. The last people to be born are now called "Omegas". "A race apart", they enjoy various prerogatives. Theo writes that the last human being born on Earth has been killed in a pub brawl.

In 2006, Xan Lyppiatt, Theo's rich and charismatic cousin, appoints himself Warden of England in the last general election. As people have lost all interest in politics, Lyppiatt abolishes democracy. He is called a despot and tyrant by his opponents, but the new society is officially referred to as egalitarian.

Theo is approached by a woman called Julian, a member of a group of dissidents calling themselves the Five Fishes. He meets with them at an isolated church. Rolf, their leader and Julian's husband, is hostile, but the others—Miriam (a former midwife), Gascoigne (a man from a military family), Luke (a former priest), and Julian—are more personable. The group wants Theo to approach Xan on their behalf and ask for various reforms, including a return to a more democratic system. During their discussions, as Theo prepares to meet with Xan, the reader learns about the situation in the UK in 2021:

 The Omegas are described as beautiful (for females) and handsome (for males), but spoiled, over-entitled, and egotistical because of their youth and luxurious lifestyle. They are violent, remote, and unstable. They regard non-Omegas (elders) with undisguised contempt, yet they are spared punishment due to their age. According to rumors, some countries sacrifice Omegas in fertility rituals outside the UK.
Due to the global infertility of mankind, newborn animals (such as kittens and puppies) are doted upon and treated as infants, pushed in prams, and dressed in children's clothing. The latest trend in London is to have elaborate christening ceremonies for newborn pets.
 The country is governed by decree of the Council of England, which consists of five people. Parliament has been reduced to an advisory role. The aims of the Council are (1) protection and security, (2) comfort, and (3) pleasure, corresponding to the Warden's promises of: (1) freedom from fear, (2) freedom from want, and (3) freedom from boredom.
 The Grenadiers, formerly an elite regiment in the British Armed Forces, are the Warden's private army. The State Secret Police (SSP) ensures the Council's decrees are executed.
 The courts still exist, but juries have been abolished. Under the "new arrangements", defendants are tried by a judge and two magistrates. All convicted criminals are dumped at a penal colony on the Isle of Man. There is no remission, escape is almost impossible, visitors are forbidden, and prisoners may not write or receive letters.
 Every citizen is required to learn skills, such as animal husbandry, which they might need to help them survive if they happen to be among the last human beings in the UK.
 Foreign workers are lured into the country and then exploited. Young people, preferably Omegas, from poorer countries come to England to work there. These "foreign Omegas" or "sojourners" are imported to do undesirable work. They are sent back at age 60 ("forcibly repatriated"). British Omegas are not allowed to emigrate so as to prevent further loss of labor.
 Elderly/infirm citizens have become a burden; nursing homes are for the privileged few. The rest are expected and sometimes forced to commit suicide by taking part in a "Quietus" (Council-sanctioned mass drowning) at age 60.
 The state has opened "pornography centers" as well as installed special transmitters that emit a kind of radiation designed to increase libido. Twice a year, healthy women under 45 must submit to a  gynecological examination, and most men must have their sperm tested, to keep hope alive.

Theo's meeting, which turns out to be a meeting with the full Council of England, does not go well. Some of the members resent him because he resigned as Xan's advisor rather than share the responsibility of governing the UK. Xan guesses that Theo's suggestions came from others and makes clear to Theo that he will take action against dissidents.

The Five Fishes distribute a leaflet detailing their demands. The SSP visit Theo. He sees Julian in the market shortly afterward. He tells her of the SSP visit, then tells her that if she ever needs him she only has to send for him. That night, however, Theo decides to leave England for the summer and visit the continent before nature overruns it.

Soon after Theo's return, Miriam tells him that Gascoigne was arrested as he was trying to rig a Quietus landing stage to explode. The other Fishes are about to go on the run, and Julian wants him. Miriam reveals why Julian did not come herself: Julian is pregnant. Theo believes Julian is deceiving herself, but when the two meet, Julian invites Theo to listen to her baby's heartbeat.

During the group's flight, Luke is killed while trying to protect Julian during a confrontation with a wild gang of Omegas. Julian confesses that the father of her child is not Rolf, but rather the deceased Luke. Rolf, who believes he should rule the UK in Xan's place, is angered at the discovery; he abandons the group to notify the Warden.

The group heads to a shack Theo knows of. Miriam delivers Julian's baby: a boy, not a girl as Julian had thought. Miriam goes to find more supplies; after she is gone too long, Theo investigates. He finds Miriam dead, garrotted in a nearby house. Theo returns to Julian, but soon afterward Julian hears a noise outside: Xan.

Theo and Xan confront each other and both fire one shot. The sudden wailing of the baby startles Xan, causing him to miss, as Rolf had thought the baby would not be born for another month. Theo shoots and kills Xan. He removes from Xan's finger the Coronation Ring, which Xan had taken to wearing as a symbol of authority, and seems poised to become the new leader of the UK, at least temporarily. The other members of the Council are introduced to the baby, whom Theo baptizes.

Adaptation

In 2006, a film adaptation by Mexican director Alfonso Cuarón and starring Julianne Moore and Clive Owen was released. Cuarón used the premise as a jumping-off point to address contemporary issues such as the treatment of refugees. The film was well received. According to Cuarón, P.D. James said in a statement sent to Universal that she was proud to be associated with it despite its differences from the source material.

Critical reception

On 5 November 2019 BBC News included The Children of Men on its list of the 100 most influential novels.

See also

Greybeard (1964) by Brian Aldiss, a science fiction novel set in an Earth with an ageing and sterile population
Pregnancy in science fiction
The Handmaid's Tale (1985), a dystopian novel by Canadian author Margaret Atwood
The White Plague (1982) by Frank Herbert, a science fiction novel in which a dedicated bio-terrorism weapon kills all women on earth, subjecting the entire human race to certain extinction

References

British novels adapted into films
1992 British novels
1992 science fiction novels
Christian novels
Dystopian novels
Novels by P. D. James
British post-apocalyptic novels
Alfred A. Knopf books
Fiction set in 2021
Faber and Faber books
Fiction about government
Science fiction novels adapted into films